The Nederburg awards for ballet and opera in South Africa were established in 1972. Previously the arts across the South African provinces were assisted by the Stellenbosch Farmers' Wineries Trust, which commissioned drama, opera and ballet and offered bursaries to students. One of the ballets financed by the Trust was David Poole's Kami in 1976. The Oude Libertas Study bursary also allowed dancers such as Veronica Paeper, Dudley Tomlinson, June Hattersley to study overseas.

The Nederburg awards were established for opera in all four of South Africa's provinces and for ballet in the Cape Province. Winners were granted R1 500 as well as a trophy.

Recipients

Recipients of the award for ballet 
These include:

 Phyllis Spira (1972, 1979)
 David Poole (1973)
 Peter Cazalet for his ballet designs (1974)
 Elizabeth Triegaardt (1975)
 John Simons (1976)
 Eduard Greyling (1977, 1983)
 Veronica Paeper (1980, 1982)
 Keith Mackintosh (1981)
 Nicolette Loxton (1986, 1987)
 Joseph Clark (1988)
 Linda Lee (1996)
 Tracy Li (1997)
 Philip Boyd (1997)
 Mary Ann de Wet (1999)
 Robin van Wyk
 Tanja Graafland
 Peter Klatzow for the ballet Hamlet
 Aubrey Meyer for the ballet Exequy

Recipients of the award for opera 
These include:

 Nellie du Toit (1973, 1975)
 Leo Quayle (1973)
 Gé Korsten (1975)
 Hendrik Hofmeyr (1988)
 Gwyneth Lloyd 
 Lawrence Folley
 Rouel Beukes
 Sidwill Hartman
 Juan Burgers
 Vetta Wise
 Ros Conrad
 Michael Renier (2002)

References

South African awards
Ballet awards
Opera in South Africa
Ballet in South Africa